Cigaritis hassoni is a butterfly in the family Lycaenidae. It is found in Katanga Province of the Democratic Republic of the Congo.

References

Butterflies described in 2003
Cigaritis
Endemic fauna of the Democratic Republic of the Congo